Volcano! is a 1926 American silent drama film directed by William K. Howard and starring Bebe Daniels, ricardo Cortez, and Wallace Beery. The picture was produced by Famous Players-Lasky and distributed by Paramount Pictures. It is based on a 1920 Broadway play Martinique by Laurence Eyre. It is preserved in the Library of Congress, UCLA Film and Television Archives, and The Museum of Modern Art.

Cast

References

External links

Line drawn artwork poster
Lobby card and a film poster (archived @ worthpoint)

1926 films
1926 drama films
1920s disaster films
1920s color films
Silent American drama films
American disaster films
Films directed by William K. Howard
American silent feature films
American films based on plays
Paramount Pictures films
Films set in Martinique
American black-and-white films
Films about volcanoes
Films with screenplays by Bernard McConville
1920s American films
1920s English-language films